Tegostoma albinalis is a moth in the family Crambidae. It was described by Koen V. N. Maes in 2004. It is found in Kenya, Namibia and South Africa.

References

Odontiini
Moths described in 2004
Moths of Africa